The Wessington Springs Carnegie Library, at 124 N. Main Ave. in Wessington Springs, South Dakota, is a Carnegie library built in 1917–18.  It is Prairie School in style.  It was listed on the National Register of Historic Places in 1999.

It was designed by architect F. C. W. Kuehn, of Huron, South Dakota, in "brown brick in a simplistic Prairie style. This block shape building features a low horizontal design, overhanging hip roof, and geometric decorative designs."

It has also been known as Wessington Springs Public Library.

In 1999 it was one of just eight Carnegie libraries in South Dakota still being used as a library.

References

External links
Facebook page

Carnegie libraries in South Dakota
National Register of Historic Places in South Dakota
Prairie School architecture
Library buildings completed in 1917
Jerauld County, South Dakota